Rosebery or Roseberry may refer to:

Places

Australia
 Rosebery, New South Wales
 Rosebery, Northern Territory
 Rosebery, Tasmania
 Rosebery, Victoria

Elsewhere
 Rosebery, British Columbia, Canada
 Roseberry, Missouri, U.S.
 Roseberry Topping, a hill in North Yorkshire, England

Other uses
 Earl of Rosebery, a title in the Peerage of Scotland
 Archibald Primrose, 5th Earl of Rosebery (1847–1929), British prime minister
Hannah Primrose, Countess of Rosebery (1851–1890), his wife
 Roseberry College, in County Durham, England
 Rosebery Park, a football ground in the Oatlands area of Glasgow, Scotland
 Rosebery School for Girls, in Epsom, Surrey, England
 Villa Rosebery, an official residence of the President of Italy

See also